The 1964 Utah State Aggies football team was an American football team that represented Utah State University as an independent during the 1964 NCAA University Division football season. In their second season under head coach Tony Knap, the Aggies compiled a 5–4–1 record and outscored all opponents by a total of 294 to 136.

The team's statistical leaders included Ron Edwards with 798 passing yards and Craig Murray with 455 rushing yards, 510 receiving yards, and 42 points scored.

Schedule

References

Utah State
Utah State Aggies football seasons
Utah State Aggies football